This Timeline of European imperialism covers episodes of imperialism outside of Europe by western nations since 1400; for other countries, see .

Pre-1700

 1402 Castillian invasion of Canary Islands.
 1415 Portuguese conquest of Ceuta.
 1420-1425 Portuguese settlement of Madeira.
 1433-1436 Portuguese settlement of Azores.
 1445 Portuguese construction of trading post on Arguin Island.
 1450 Portuguese construction of trading post on Gorée Island.
 1462 Portuguese settlement of Cape Verde islands.
 1474 Portuguese settlement of Annobón island.
 1470 Portuguese settlement of Bioko island.
 1482 Portuguese construction of Elmina Castle.
 1493 Portuguese settlement of São Tomé and Príncipe.
 1510 Portuguese conquest of Goa.
 1511 Portuguese conquest of Malacca City.
 1517 Portuguese conquest of Colombo.
 1556 Portuguese colonization of Timor.
 1557 Portuguese construction of trading post in Macau.
 1556-1599 Spanish conquest of Philippines.
 1598: Dutch established colony on uninhabited island of Mauritius; they abandon it in 1710.
 1608: Dutch opened their first trading post in India at Golconda.
 1613: Dutch East India Company expands operations in Java.
 1613–20: Netherlands becomes England's major rival in trade, fishing, and whaling. The Dutch form alliances with Sweden and the Hanseatic League; England counters with an alliance with Denmark.
1623. The Amboyna massacre occurs in Japan with execution of English traders; England closes its commercial base opened in 1613 at Hirado. Trade ends for more than two centuries.
 1664. French East India Company Chartered for trade in Asia and Africa.

Colonization of North America

 1565 – St. Augustine, Florida – Spanish
 1604 – Acadia – French
 1605 – Port Royal – French; in Nova Scotia
 1607 – Jamestown, Virginia – English; established by Virginia Company
 1607 – Popham Colony – English; failed effort in Maine
 1608 – Quebec, Canada – French
 1610 – Cuper's Cove, First English settlement in Newfoundland; abandoned by 1820
 1610 – Santa Fe, New Mexico – Spanish
 1612 – Bermuda – English; established by Virginia Company
 1615 – Fort Nassau – Dutch; became Albany New York
 1620 – St. John's, Newfoundland – English; capital of Newfoundland
 1620 – Plymouth Colony, absorbed by Massachusetts Bay– English; small settlement by Pilgrims
 1621 – Nova Scotia – Scottish
 1623 – Portsmouth, New Hampshire – English; becomes the Colony of New Hampshire
 1625 – New Amsterdam – Dutch; becomes New York City
 1630 – Massachusetts Bay Colony – English; The main Puritan colony.
 1632 – Williamsburgh – English; becomes the capital of Virginia.
 1633 – Fort Hoop – Dutch settlement; Now part of Hartford Connecticut
 1633 – Windsor, Connecticut – English
 1634 – Maryland Colony  – English

 1634 – Wethersfield, Connecticut – First English settlement in Connecticut, comprising migrants from Massachusetts Bay.
 1635 – Territory of Sagadahock – English
 1636 – Providence Plantations – English; became Rhode Island* 
 1636 – Connecticut Colony – English
 1638 – New Haven Colony – English; later merged into Connecticut colony
 1638 – Fort Christina – Swedish; now part of Wilmington Delaware
 1638 – Hampton, New Hampshire – English
 1639 – San Marcos – Spanish
 1640 – Swedesboro- Swedish
 1651 – Fort Casimir – Dutch
 1660 – Bergen – Dutch
 1670 – Charleston, South Carolina – English
 1682 – Pennsylvania – English Quakers;
 1683? – Fort Saint Louis (Illinois)- French;
 1683 – East New Jersey – Scottish
 1684 – Stuarts Town, Carolina – Scottish
 1685 – Fort Saint Louis (Texas)- French
 1698 – Pensacola, Florida – Spanish (colonized by Tomas Romero II)
 1699 – Louisiana (New France) – French;

1700 to 1799
1704: Gibraltar captured by British on 4 August; becomes British naval bastion into the 21st century
 1713: Treaty of Utrecht, ends War of the Spanish Succession and gives Britain territorial gains, especially Gibraltar, Acadia, Newfoundland, and the land surrounding Hudson Bay. The lower Great Lakes-Ohio area became a free trade zone. 
 1756–1763 Seven Years' War,  Britain,  Prussia, and Hanover against France, Austria, the Russian Empire, Sweden, and Saxony. Major battles in Europe and North America; the East India Company also in involved in the Third Carnatic War (1756–1763) in India. Britain victorious and takes control of all of Canada; France seeks revenge.
 1775–1783: American Revolutionary War as Thirteen Colonies revolt; Britain has no major allies. It is the first successful colonial revolt in European history.
 1783: Treaty of Paris ends Revolutionary War; British give generous terms to US with boundaries as British North America on north, Mississippi River on west, Florida on south. Britain gives East and West Florida to Spain
 1784: Britain allows trade with America but forbid some American food exports to West Indies; British exports to America reach £3.7 million, imports only £750,000
 1784: Pitt's India Act re-organised the British East India Company to minimise corruption; it centralised British rule by increasing the power of the Governor-General

1793 to 1870

 1792: In India, British victory over Tipu Sultan in Third Anglo-Mysore War; cession of one half of Mysore to the British and their allies.
 1793–1815: Wars of the French Revolution, and Napoleonic wars; French conquests spread Ideas of the French Revolution, including abolition of serfdom, modern legal systems, and of Holy Roman Empire; stimulate rise of nationalism
 1804–1865: Russia expand across Siberia to Pacific.
 1804–1813: Uprising in Serbia against the ruling Ottoman Empire
 1807: Britain makes the international slave trade criminal; Slave Trade Act 1807; United States criminalizes the international slave trade at the same time.
 1810–1820s: Spanish American wars of independence
 1810–1821: Mexican War of Independence
 1814–15:   Congress of Vienna; Reverses French conquests; restores reactionaries to power. However, many liberal reforms persist; Russia emerges as a powerful factor in European affairs.
 1815–1817: Serbian uprising leading to Serbian autonomy
 1819:  Stamford Raffles founds Singapore as outpost of British Empire.
 1821–1823: Greek War of Independence
 1822: Independence of Brazil proclaimed by Dom Pedro I
 1822–27: George Canning in charge of British foreign policy, avoids co-operation with European powers.
 1823: United States issues Monroe Doctrine to preserve newly independent Latin American states; issued in cooperation with Britain, whose goal is to prevent French & Spanish influence and allow British merchants access to the opening markets. American goal is to prevent the New World becoming a battlefield among European powers.
 1821–32: Greece wins  Greek War of Independence against the Ottoman Empire; the 1832 Treaty of Constantinople is ratified at the London Conference of 1832.
 1830: Start of the French conquest of Algeria
 1833:  Slavery Abolition Act 1833 frees slaves in British Empire; the owners (who mostly reside in Britain) are paid £20 million.
 1839–42: Britain wages First Opium War against China
 1842: Britain forces China to sign the Treaty of Nanking.  It opens trade, cedes territory (especially Hong Kong), fixes Chinese tariffs at a low rate, grants extraterritorial rights to foreigners, and provides both a most favoured nation clause, as well as diplomatic representation.
 1845: Oregon boundary dispute threatens war between Great Britain and the United States.
 1846: Oregon Treaty ends dispute with the United States. Border settled on the 49th parallel. The British territory becomes British Columbia and later joins Canada.  The American territory becomes Oregon Territory and will later become the states of Oregon, Washington, and Idaho, as well as parts of Wyoming and Montana.
 1846: The Corn Laws are repealed; free trade in grain strengthens the British economy By increasing trade with  exporting nations.
 1845: Republic of Texas voluntarily joins the United States. Annexation causes the Mexican–American War, 1846–48.
 1848: United States victorious in Mexican–American War; annexes area from New Mexico to California
 1848–49: Second Sikh war; the British East India Company subjugates the Sikh Empire, and annexes Punjab
 1857: Indian Rebellion suppressed. It has major long-term impact on reluctance to grant independence to Indians.
 1858: The government of India transferred from East India Company to the crown; the government appoints a viceroy. He rules portions of India directly, and dominates local princes in the other portions. British rule guarantees that local wars will not happen inside India.
1861–1867: French intervention in Mexico; United States demands French withdrawal after 1865; France removes its army, and its puppet Emperor is executed.
 1862: Treaty of Saigon;  France occupies three provinces in southern Vietnam.
 1863: France establishes a protectorate over Cambodia.
 1867: British North America Act, 1867 creates the Dominion of Canada, a federation with internal self-government; foreign and defence matters are still handled by London.

1870–1914
 1874: Second Treaty of Saigon, France controls all of South Vietnam
 1875–1900: Britain, France, Germany, Portugal and Italy join in the Scramble for Africa
 1876: Korea signs unequal treaty with Japan
 1878: Austria occupies Bosnia-Herzegovina while Ottoman Empire is at war with Russia
 1878: Ottoman Empire wins  main possessions in Europe; Treaty of Berlin recognising the independence of Romania, Serbia and Montenegro and the autonomy of Bulgaria
 1882: Korea signs equal treaties with the United States and others
 1884:  France makes Vietnam a country .
 1885: King Leopold of Belgium establishes the Congo Free State, under his personal control. There is a role for the government of Belgium until the King's financial difficulties lead to a series of loans; it takes over in 1908.

 1893: France makes Laos a protectorate.
 1893: Overthrow of the Hawaiian Kingdom
 1895: Creation of French West Africa (AOF)
 1896–1910: Japan takes full control of Korea.
 1900: Fashoda Incident in Africa threatens war between France and Britain; Settled peacefully
 1898: United States demands that Spain immediately reform its rule in Cuba; Spain procrastinates; US wins short Spanish–American War
 1898: Annexation of the Republic of Hawaii as a United States territory via the Newlands Resolution
 1898: In the Treaty of Paris, the United States obtains the Philippines, Guam, Puerto Rico, and makes Cuba a protectorate.
 1899–1900: Anti-imperialist sentiment in the United States mobilizes but fails to stop the expansion.
 1900-08: King Leopold is denounced worldwide for his maltreatment of rubber workers in Congo. The campaign is led by journalist E.D. Morel.
 1908: Austria annexes Bosnia and Herzegovina; pays compensation  and colonial issues. The chief pressure group was the Parti colonial, a coalition of 50 organizations with a combined total of 5,000 members.

1914–1919
 1917: Jones Act gives full American citizenship to Puerto Ricans.
 1918: Austrian Empire ends, Austria becomes a republic, Hungary becomes a kingdom, Czechoslovakia, Poland, and Yugoslavia become independent

 1919: German and Ottoman colonies came under the control of the League of Nations, which distributed them as "mandates" to Great Britain, France, Japan, Belgium, South Africa, Australia and New Zealand.

Maps

See also
 Timeline of European exploration
 Chronology of Western colonialism
 British Empire
 Historiography of the British Empire
 French colonial empire
 Timeline of British diplomatic history
 Chinese expansionism
 Empire of Japan
 Inca Empire
 Ottoman Empire
Timeline of the European colonization of North America

Notes

Further reading

Surveys
 Morris, Richard B. and Graham W. Irwin, eds. Harper Encyclopedia of the Modern World: A Concise Reference History from 1760 to the Present (1970) online
 Albrecht-Carrié, René. A Diplomatic History of Europe Since the Congress of Vienna (1958), 736pp; a basic introduction, 1815–1955 online free to borrow
 Baumgart, Winfried. Imperialism: The Idea and Reality of British and French Colonial Expansion, 1880–1914 (1982)
 Betts, Raymond F. The False Dawn: European Imperialism in the Nineteenth Century (1975)
 Betts, Raymond F. Uncertain Dimensions: Western Overseas Empires in the Twentieth Century (1985)
 Black, Jeremy.  European International Relations, 1648–1815 (2002)  excerpt and text search
 Burbank, Jane, and Frederick Cooper. Empires in World History: Power and the Politics of Difference (2011), Very wide-ranging coverage from Rome to the 1980s; 511pp
 Dodge, Ernest S. Islands and Empires: Western Impact on the Pacific and East Asia (1976)
 Furber, Holden. Rival Empires of Trade in the Orient, 1600-1800 (1976)
 Furber, Holden, and Boyd C Shafer. Rival Empires of Trade in the Orient, 1600-1800 (1976)
 Hodge, Carl Cavanagh, ed. Encyclopedia of the Age of Imperialism, 1800-1914 (2 vol. 2007), Focus on European leaders
 Kennedy, Paul. The Rise and Fall of the Great Powers: Economic Change and Military Conflict from 1500 to 2000 (1989)  excerpt and text search; very wide-ranging, with much on economic power
 Langer, William. An Encyclopedia of World History (5th ed. 1973), very detailed outline; 6th edition ed. by Peter Stearns (2001) has more detail on Third World
 McAlister, Lyle N. Spain and Portugal in the New World, 1492-1700 (1984)
 Mowat, R. B. A History of European Diplomacy 1815–1914 (1922), basic introduction
 Page, Melvin E. ed. Colonialism: An International Social, Cultural, and Political Encyclopedia (3 vol. 2003); vol. 3 consists of primary documents; vol. 2 pages 647-831 has a detailed chronology
 Porter, Andrew. European Imperialism, 1860-1914 (1996), Brief survey focuses on historiography
 Savelle, Max. Empires to Nations: Expansion in America, 1713-1824 (1975)
 Smith, Tony. The Pattern of Imperialism: The United States, Great Britain and the Late-Industrializing World Since 1815 (1981)
 Taylor, A.J.P.  The Struggle for Mastery in Europe: 1848–1918 (1954) excerpt and text search; advanced analysis Of diplomacy
 Wilson, Henry. The Imperial Experience in Sub-Saharan Africa since 1870 (1977)

Africa
 .
 Wesseling, H.L. and Arnold J. Pomerans.  Divide and rule: The partition of Africa, 1880–1914 (Praeger, 1996.) online

Asia
 Cady, John Frank. The roots of French imperialism in Eastern Asia (1967).
 Darby, Phillip. Three Faces of Imperialism: British and American Approaches to Asia and Africa, 1870-1970 (1987)
 Davis, Clarence B. "Financing Imperialism: British and American Bankers as Vectors of Imperial Expansion in China, 1908–1920." Business History Review 56.02 (1982): 236–264.
 Harris, Paul W. "Cultural imperialism and American protestant missionaries: collaboration and dependency in mid-nineteenth-century China." Pacific Historical Review (1991): 309–338. in JSTOR
 Kazemzadeh, Firuz. Russia and Britain in Persia, 1864-1914: A Study in Imperialism (1968)
 Lebra-Chapman, Joyce. Japan's Greater East Asia co-prosperity sphere in World War II: selected readings and documents (Oxford University Press, 1975)
 Lee, Robert. France and the exploitation of China, 1885-1901: A study in economic imperialism (1989)
 Webster, Anthony. Gentleman Capitalists: British Imperialism in Southeast Asia 1770-1890 (IB Tauris, 1998)

Atlantic world
 Greene, Jack P., and Philip D. Morgan,  Atlantic History: A Critical Appraisal, ed. by (Oxford University Press, 2009)
 Hodson, Christopher, and Brett Rushforth, "Absolutely Atlantic: Colonialism and the Early Modern French State in Recent Historiography," History Compass, (January 2010) 8#1 pp 101–117

Latin America
 Brown, Matthew, ed. Informal Empire in Latin America: Culture, Commerce, and Capital (2009)
 Dávila, Carlos, et al. . Business History in Latin America: The Experience of Seven Countries (Liverpool University Press, 1999) online
 Miller, Rory. Britain and Latin America in the nineteenth and twentieth centuries (Longman, 1993)

British Empire

Bayly, C. A. ed. Atlas of the British Empire (1989). survey by scholars; heavily illustrated
Brendon, Piers. "A Moral Audit of the British Empire." History Today, (Oct 2007), Vol. 57 Issue 10, pp 44–47, online 
Brendon, Piers. The Decline and Fall of the British Empire, 1781-1997 (2008), wide-ranging survey
Colley, Linda. Captives: Britain, Empire, and the World, 1600-1850 (2004), 464pp
 Dalziel, Nigel. The Penguin Historical Atlas of the British Empire (2006), 144 pp
Darwin, John. The Empire Project: The Rise and Fall of the British World-System, 1830-1970 (2009)  excerpt and text search 
 Darwin, John. Unfinished Empire: The Global Expansion of Britain (2013) 
Ferguson, Niall. Empire: The Rise and Demise of the British World Order and the Lessons for Global Power (2002)
 Gallagher, John, and Ronald Robinson. "The Imperialism of Free Trade" Economic History Review (1953) 6#1 pp: 1-15. Highly influential argument that British merchants and financiers imposed an economic imperialism without political control. in JSTOR
Hyam, Ronald.  Britain's Imperial Century, 1815-1914: A Study of Empire and Expansion (1993).
James, Lawrence.  The Rise and Fall of the British Empire (1997), very highly regarded survey.
Judd, Denis. Empire: The British Imperial Experience, From 1765 to the Present (1996). online edition
Lloyd; T. O. The British Empire, 1558-1995 Oxford University Press, 1996 online edition
Louis, William. Roger (general editor), The Oxford History of the British Empire, 5 vols. (1998–99).
vol 1 "The Origins of Empire" ed. by Nicholas Canny
vol 2 "The Eighteenth Century" ed. by P. J. Marshall  excerpt and text search
vol 3 The Nineteenth Century edited by William Roger Louis, Alaine M. Low, Andrew Porter; (1998). 780 pgs. online edition
vol 4 The Twentieth Century edited by Judith M. Brown, (1998). 773 pgs online edition
vol 5 "Historiography" ed, by Robin W. Winks (1999)
Marshall, P.J. (ed.) The Cambridge Illustrated History of the British Empire (1996). excerpt and text search
James, Lawrence.  The Rise and Fall of the British Empire (1997).
Marshall, P.J. (ed.) The Cambridge Illustrated History of the British Empire (1996). excerpt and text search
Robinson, Howard. The Development of the British Empire (1922), 465pp 30 online edition
Schreuder, Deryck, and Stuart Ward, eds. Australia's Empire  (Oxford History of the British Empire Companion Series) (2010)
 Simms, Brendan. Three Victories and a Defeat: The Rise and Fall of the First British Empire (2008), 800pp excerpt and text search
Smith, Simon C. British Imperialism 1750-1970 (1998). brief
Stockwell, Sarah, ed. The British Empire: Themes and Perspectives (2008) 355pp.
Weigall, David. Britain and the World, 1815–1986: A Dictionary of International relations (1989)

French Empire

 Hutton, Patrick H. ed. Historical Dictionary of the Third French Republic, 1870–1940 (2 vol 1986)
 Northcutt, Wayne, ed. Historical Dictionary of the French Fourth and Fifth Republics, 1946- 1991 (1992)
 Aldrich, Robert. Greater France: A History of French Overseas Expansion (1996)
 Betts, Raymond. Assimilation and Association in French Colonial Theory, 1890–1914 (2005) excerpt and text search
 Clayton, Anthony.  The Wars of French Decolonization (1995)
 .
 Roberts, Stephen H. History of French Colonial Policy (1870-1925) (2 vol 1929) vol 1 online also vol 2 online; Comprehensive scholarly history
 Rosenblum, Mort. Mission to Civilize: The French Way (1986) online review
 Priestley, Herbert Ingram. (1938) France overseas;: A study of modern imperialism 463pp; encyclopedic coverage as of late 1930s
 Thomas, Martin. The French Empire Between the Wars: Imperialism, Politics and Society (2007) 1919–1939
 Thompson, Virginia, and Richard Adloff. French West Africa (Stanford University Press, 1958)

Decolonization
 Lawrence, Adria K. Imperial Rule and the Politics of Nationalism:  Anti-Colonial Protest in the French Empire (Cambridge UP, 2013) online reviews
 Rothermund,  Dietmar. Memories of Post-Imperial Nations: The Aftermath of Decolonization, 1945-2013 (2015) excerpt; Compares the impact on Great Britain, the Netherlands, Belgium, France, Portugal, Italy and Japan
 Sanders, David. Losing an Empire, Finding a Role: British Foreign Policy Since 1945 (1990) broad coverage of all topics in British foreign policy
 Simpson, Alfred William Brian. Human Rights and the End of Empire: Britain and the Genesis of the European Convention (Oxford University Press, 2004).
 Smith, Tony. "A comparative study of French and British decolonization." Comparative Studies in Society and History (1978) 20#1 pp: 70-102. online
 Thomas, Martin, Bob Moore, and Lawrence J. Butler. Crises of Empire: Decolonization and Europe's imperial states (Bloomsbury Publishing, 2015)

Primary sources
 Page, Melvin E. ed. Colonialism: An International Social, Cultural, and Political Encyclopedia (3 vol. 2003); vol. 3 consists of primary documents

Historiography of the British Empire
Timeline
Imperialism
History of the foreign relations of India
History of the foreign relations of Pakistan
Overseas empires
Timeline
Diplomatic
Western culture